Amran Abdul Ghani (born 12 August 1973) was the Member of the Parliament of Malaysia for the Tanah Merah constituency in Kelantan from 2008 to 2013, sitting as a member of the People's Justice Party (PKR) in the Pakatan Rakyat opposition coalition.

Amran was elected to the Tanah Merah seat in the 2008 election, defeating the incumbent Shaari Hassan of the ruling Barisan Nasional coalition. Shaari alleged that members of UMNO (his own party) sabotaged his campaign. Amran did not recontest the seat in the 2013 election. Instead, he shifted to the state of KG Sat to contest the State Assembly seat of Paloh, losing to UMNO's long-serving incumbent Norzula Mat Diah. Some local PKR members objected to Amran being parachuted into the state as a candidate and publicly supported Norzula instead.

Election results

References

Living people
1973 births
People from Kelantan
Members of the Dewan Rakyat
Former People's Justice Party (Malaysia) politicians
Malaysian United Indigenous Party politicians
Malaysian people of Malay descent
Malaysian Muslims